Jared Paul is an American artist manager and live entertainment producer. Paul currently manages artists including New Kids on the Block, Sabrina Carpenter and Lea Michele. Faculty has put on a number of touring productions in recent years, including Dancing with the Stars: Live!, America’s Got Talent Live!, Boston Strong and GLEE Live! as well as tours for artists including the Total Package Tour featuring NKOTB, Boyz II Men and Paula Abdul. Jared is also involved in the upcoming "HAPPY PLACE" pop up in Los Angeles.

References 

Year of birth missing (living people)
Living people
Talent managers
American entertainment industry businesspeople